Hurstville Grove is a suburb in southern Sydney, in the state of New South Wales, Australia. It is located 19 kilometres south of the Sydney central business district and is part of the local government area of the Georges River Council, in the St George area. 

Hurstville Grove stretches from Hillcrest Avenue to the shore of Oatley Bay, on the Georges River. It is mainly residential with a few shops located on Hillcrest Avenue. Hurstville and South Hurstville are separate suburbs located to the northeast.

History

The Hurstville area was granted to Captain John Townson and his brother Robert Townson in 1808; Captain Townson was granted  which was on the land now occupied by the suburb of Hurstville and parts of Bexley, while Robert was granted the land which is now occupied by Penshurst, Mortdale, and parts of Peakhurst. The next year, Captain Townson was granted an additional  in the area now occupied by Kingsgrove and Beverly Hills. The Townson brothers, however, were not happy with the heavily timbered land that they were given because it was not suitable for the farming of sheep for wool; consequently, it is likely that the brothers never occupied their land.

The land was sold to a wealthy merchant named Simeon Lord (1771–1840) in 1812, who called his land Lord's Bush. When Simeon Lord died, the land became the property of John Rose Holden and James Holt of the Bank of N.S.W.

The land was sold to Michael Gannon (1800–61) in 1850 and became known as Gannon's Forest. The Gannon's Forest post office opened in 1881. The local school was known as Hurstville by School Inspector MacIntyre in 1876. When the railway arrived in 1884, the station took the name "Hurstville" from the school. Hurstville municipality was incorporated in 1887.

Churches
 St Aidan's Anglican Church

Parks and waterways
 Poulton Park, Willunga Reserve, Moore Park, Grove Park, Quarry Reserve
 Oatley Bay, part of the Georges River waterway

Population
English was stated as the only language spoken at home by 53.7% of residents and the most common other languages spoken were Cantonese 10.0%, Greek 9.2% and Mandarin 5.8%. The most common responses for religious affiliation were Catholic 28.7%, Orthodox 17.5%, and No Religion 16.0%.

References

Suburbs of Sydney
Georges River Council